The cabinet of Egyptian Prime Minister Ibrahim Mahlab had a limited reshuffle on 5 March 2015. Two cabinet portfolios (the Ministry of Technical Education and the Ministry of Population) have been added.

Cabinet members

References

2015 establishments in Egypt
Cabinets of Egypt
Egypt, Cabinet
Cabinets established in 2015